Lieksanjoki or Lenderka is a river of Finland and Russia that begins in the Republic of Karelia in Russia. It flows into the Lake Pielinen in Northern Karelia, Finland. Parts of its basin in Russia are the lakes Lake Leksozero and Lake Tulos in the Republic of Karelia. The river itself is a part the Vuoksi River basin in Finland and Russia, which in turn is a part of the Neva basin in Russia.

See also
Lieksa
List of rivers of Finland

External links
 

Rivers of Finland
Rivers of the Republic of Karelia
Tributaries of the Vuoksi
International rivers of Europe